POP THE PIXEL is a graphic design & web design creative studio based in Los Angeles, California. 
Founded by Adam Lyons in 2011, POP THE PIXEL is a company that assists clients with branding small businesses and creating client websites, and is owned by Adam Lyons.

The Official Los Angeles Condom
In 2012, POP THE PIXEL received recognition for creating the Grand Prize Winning Design of The Official Los Angeles Condom by One Condoms.  The contest, which was titled “L.A.’s Next Sex Symbol”, launched in late May 2012 and received over 500 entries with more than 185,000 online votes cast.  The design includes the phrase “Suit Up”. The top 50 condom wrapper designs were chosen by a panel of judges including gossip columnist Perez Hilton, as well as Julia Allison, relationship expert and star of the new BRAVO show Miss Advised. Additional judges included Scott McPherson, creative director of The Advocate and HIV Plus Magazine and co-founder of The Stigma Project; Oriol Gutierrez, the editor of POZ Magazine; David Stern, the publisher of Frontiers IN LA Magazine; Pepe Torres, publisher of Adelante Magazine; and members of a community advisory board.  From the top 50 designs, the public voted for the finalists and the grand prize winner.   On July 2, 2012, Adam Lyons was a guest interviewee on the Patt Morrison show on 89.3 KPCC Southern California Public Radio to discuss the project on-air.

Summer Slogan Contest
In July 2012, POP THE PIXEL received recognition for creating the winning design for the "Summer Slogan Contest" hosted by Impulse Group. The winning design includes the slogan "Show Some Love".

Publications
POP THE PIXEL's artwork has been published in Odyssey (magazine), Frontiers LA (magazine), Instinct (magazine), Metrosource (magazine), Adalente (magazine), Gloss (magazine), Noize (magazine), and Rage (magazine). An interview with its founder, Adam Lyons, has been published in VoyageLA (online magazine).

References

External links
Official Website
http://blogs.laweekly.com/informer/2012/06/la_countys_classy_new_condom.php
https://web.archive.org/web/20160505063941/http://laist.com/2012/06/28/gentlemen_we_know_what_you.php
https://web.archive.org/web/20120809021403/http://zev.lacounty.gov/news/condom-contest-winner-takes-a-bow
http://www.frontiersla.com/Blog/FrontierBlog/blogentry.aspx?BlogEntryID=10399408
http://voyagela.com/interview/meet-adam-lyons-of-pop-the-pixel-in-hollywood-ca/

Companies based in Los Angeles
Companies established in 2011